Lucas Schoofs (born 3 January 1997) is a Belgian footballer plays as a defending midfielder for Heracles Almelo. He began his career in the youth teams of Lommel United in 2014.

Club career
Schoofs was educated at then-Belgian Second Division side Lommel United, in which he went through the youth teams. On 27 April 2014, he was selected for the last game of the 2013–14 season against Sint-Truiden and made his official, substituting Thomas Jutten in the 78th minute. In the 2014–15 season, he was included into the selection. Schoofs scored his first goal on 30 August 2014 against Roeselare.

On 29 August 2015, Schoofs was transferred to the national champions K.A.A. Gent. Gent allowed Schoofs first to develop a further year on loan at Lommel.

Career statistics

References

External links
 
 

1997 births
Living people
Association football midfielders
Belgian footballers
Belgian expatriate footballers
Belgium youth international footballers
Lommel S.K. players
K.A.A. Gent players
Oud-Heverlee Leuven players
NAC Breda players
Heracles Almelo players
Belgian Pro League players
Challenger Pro League players
Eredivisie players
Expatriate footballers in the Netherlands